Abram Smith may refer to:

People
Abram Smith (American football) (born 1998), American football player
Abram D. Smith (1811–1865), American lawyer and politician

Events
Lynching of Thomas Shipp and Abram Smith, the lynching of two African-American men in 1930

See also
Abraham Smith (disambiguation)